Franklin F. Bahret (1858 – March 30, 1888), sometimes referenced as Frank J. Bahret was a Major League Baseball outfielder and catcher for the Baltimore Monumentals of the Union Association in 1884. He also played for Indianapolis during the 1884 season. He stood 6'1" and weighed 184 lbs.

Bahret was born in Poughkeepsie, New York, in 1858. He debuted on April 17 (Opening Day) against the Washington Nationals. He had no hits in four at-bats, but played well in center field. Bahret made his second and last professional baseball appearance on April 22, 1884, playing in center field against the Philadelphia Keystones. He was released from the Monumentals before the end of April. For his career, he had zero hits in eight at bats and handled four fielding chances without an error.

After his brief baseball career, Bahret worked as a cooper in Baltimore. He died on March 30, 1888 at his home in Poughkeepsie, New York.

References

External links

19th-century baseball players
Major League Baseball outfielders
Baltimore Monumentals players
Baseball players from New York (state)
Sportspeople from Poughkeepsie, New York
1858 births
1888 deaths
Major League Baseball center fielders
Major League Baseball right fielders
Burials at Poughkeepsie Rural Cemetery